Hawai may refer to:

Places
 Hawai, Tottori, a town in Tottori Prefecture, Japan
 Hawai, India, the administrative headquarters of Anjaw District, in Arunachal Pradesh, India
 Hāwai, New Zealand
 Hawai River, New Zealand

Other uses
 "Hawái" (song), a 2020 song by Maluma

See also
 Hawaii, 50th state of the United States
 Havai'i, an older name for the island of Raiatea
 Huawei, a Chinese multinational technology company
 Hawaii (disambiguation)